Jean Alphonse Roehn (January 31, 1799 – May 10, 1864) was a French painter and caricaturist.

His father was painter Adolphe Roehn. In 1813, Jean Alphonse went to study at the École des Beaux Arts, where he studied under Jean-Baptiste Regnault and Antoine-Jean Gros. He started exhibiting painting at the Salon in 1822, and in 1827, he won a second class medal. He was also a drawing teacher at the Louis-Legrand School. His painting Le braconnier (The poacher) is in the collection of the Louvre.

In addition to painting, he drew cartoons, including one lampooning the British as uncultured after Napoleon's defeat at Waterloo. That cartoon and others are in the collection of the British Museum.

Gallery

References

External links 

 Art by Roehn at MutualArt.com

1799 births
1864 deaths
19th-century French painters
Pupils of Antoine-Jean Gros
Painters from Paris